Rody and Mastico is a 1989 educational interactive storybook video game for children, released on Atari ST, Amiga, Amstrad CPC and DOS. The game was available in English, French, and German. The game was coded by Jean-Michel Forgeas. A seventh unofficial episode, Rody in Ibiza, was developed by fans in 2016

Plot and gameplay 
The game consists of 6 parts, each developing the story further toward its ultimate conclusion. The protagonist Rody and his companion Mastico are on a quest to locate the multicoloured star. To progress through the story, players must correctly answer questions.

Critical reception 

A review in Joystick gave the original game a rating of 60%, while two separate reviews of the sequel gave scores of 78%, and 89%. Amstar praised the graphics, deeming them appealing to the game's target market.

The software was nominated by Tilt for an Educational Gold Tilt award for Best Educational Software.

References

External links
 Miscellaneous documents
 Interview
 Amiga Joker review
 Aktueller Software Markt article 1
 Aktueller Software Markt article 2

1989 video games
Video games developed in France
Lankhor games